Leslie Matthew Stewart (born 21 March 1961) is a retired Trinidadian boxer. A former world champion and two-time world title challenger, Stewart held the WBA light heavyweight title in 1987.

Professional career
Known as "Laventille Tiger", Stewart turned professional in 1982 and challenged for the vacant WBA Light Heavyweight Title in 1986, but was TKO'd by Marvin Johnson when the bout was stopped on cuts. In the rematch the following year, Stewart dominated Johnson, and Johnson's corner retired the fighter in the ninth round. Stewart lost the belt in his first defense to Virgil Hill. In 1988 he challenged WBC Light Heavyweight Title holder Donny Lalonde, but lost via TKO. In 1989 he took on WBO Light Heavyweight Title holder Michael Moorer, but again lost via TKO. He retired in 2000 after bouts of inactivity in the 1990s.

Professional boxing record

See also
List of light-heavyweight boxing champions

External links

|-

1961 births
Living people
Light-heavyweight boxers
Cruiserweight boxers
World light-heavyweight boxing champions
World Boxing Association champions
Trinidad and Tobago male boxers
Recipients of the Chaconia Medal